Club Deportivo Beti Onak is a Spanish sports club based in Villava in the autonomous community of Navarre. Founded in 1950, the club has football, handball and Basque pelota sections.

The football section was founded in 1966, it plays in Tercera División RFEF – Group 15, holding home matches at the Estadio Lorenzo Goikoa, with a capacity of 2,000 people.

Season to season

21 seasons in Tercera División
1 season in Tercera División RFEF

References

External links
 
Soccerway team profile

Football clubs in Navarre
Association football clubs established in 1966
1950 establishments in Spain